Third Row Centre is a 2014 film written and directed by Lloyd Handley. Shot on a micro-budget, the film went on to win the Best Feature Film award at the 2014 Madrid International Film Festival

Premise
Disheartened by a dull job and a repetitive life, a lonely telephone operator discovers a new voyeuristic obsession.

References

External links

 

2014 films
Films set in London
British thriller films
2014 thriller films
2010s English-language films
2010s British films